Zhuangqiao railway station is a railway station on the Hangzhou–Ningbo high-speed railway located in Jiangbei District, Ningbo, Zhejiang, China.

Metro station
The station is served by Line 4 of Ningbo Rail Transit.

Railway stations in Zhejiang